The 2013–14 Jacksonville Dolphins men's basketball team represented Jacksonville University during the 2013–14 NCAA Division I men's basketball season. The Dolphins were members of the Atlantic Sun Conference (A-Sun). They were led by ninth year head coach Cliff Warren and played their home games in both the Veterans Memorial Arena and Swisher Gymnasium. They finished the season 12–18, 8–10 in A-Sun play to finish in seventh place. They lost in the quarterfinals of the Atlantic Sun tournament to Mercer.

Roster

Schedule
 
|-
!colspan=9 style="background:#; color:#FFFFFF;"| Regular season

|-
!colspan=9 style="background:#; color:#FFFFFF;"| Atlantic Sun tournament

References

Jacksonville Dolphins men's basketball seasons
Jacksonville